"Make a Move" is a single released by alternative rock band Incubus, released from the soundtrack to the film Stealth.

The song utilizes a unique melodic structure in that its main guitar and bass riffs are in the key of E minor, while lead vocalist Brandon Boyd's melody is performed in the key of E major, with the notes cleverly placed to prevent the clashing minor third (G) and major third (G#) from occurring simultaneously.

Track listing

Promo CD
Make A Move (Radio Edit)
Make A Move (Album Version)

External links

2005 singles
Incubus (band) songs
2005 songs
Songs written by Brandon Boyd
Songs written by Mike Einziger
Songs written by Ben Kenney
Songs written by Chris Kilmore
Songs written by José Pasillas
Music videos directed by Marc Webb